Basem Atallah Al-Baqqi (born 11 July 1989) is a Saudi Arabian professional footballer who currently plays as a goalkeeper for Al-Wehda .

Honours

Club
Al-Ahli
Saudi Champions Cup: 2012, 2016
Saudi Professional League: 2015–16

References

Living people
1989 births
People from Ha'il
Association football goalkeepers
Saudi Arabian footballers
Al-Ahli Saudi FC players
Al-Tai FC players
Al-Taawoun FC players
Al-Wehda Club (Mecca) players
Saudi First Division League players
Saudi Professional League players